Lapchick is a surname. Notable people with the surname include:

Joe Lapchick (1900–1970), American basketball player
Richard Lapchick, American academic and activist